The Colombian Civil War of 1876 (also called War of the Schools) was a civil war in the United States of Colombia (present-day Colombia) that went on from 1876 to 1877. The causes of the war date back to approximately 1870, when members of the Colombian Liberal Party led by the Liberal radical Eustorgio Salgar attempted to introduce public education for the Colombian states, while the Colombian Conservative Party advocated for putting education solely under the control of the Roman Catholic church.

Antecedent 
Its origin was the discontent of the conservatives for the secularizing measures adopted in education and for the openly anti-religious and anti-clerical spirit of the radicals. The government in power would have invited a German Mission to transform teaching methods in schools, until then controlled by the Catholic Church. This secularist initiative failed when the Church promoted resistance from conservative factions, which would end up sparking inter-partisan violence once again, blocking the attempt to secularize education.

War 
At the beginning of 1876, in the government of Aquileo Parra, the Church continued to refuse to cede the monopoly of education and, in July 1876, war finally broke out in the State of Cauca, which hardened in the months following the United States. from Antioquia, Tolima, Cundinamarca and Santander.

See also
Wars involving Colombia

References

Military history of Colombia
Civil wars involving the states and peoples of South America
1876 in Colombia
Civil wars of the Industrial era
Conflicts in 1876